The 2018 Pan American Archery Championships was held in Medellín, Colombia from 14 to 19 August 2018.

Medal summary

Recurve

Compound

References

External links
Results book

Pan American Archery Championships
Pan American Archery Championships
Pan American Archery Championships
International archery competitions hosted by Colombia
Pan American Archery Championships